Rachid O'Neale (born 27 July 1991) is a Barbadian cricketer. He made his first-class debut for Barbados in the 2016–17 Regional Four Day Competition on 7 April 2017.

References

External links
 

1991 births
Living people
Barbadian cricketers
Barbados cricketers